Malmö FF competed in Division 2 Sydsvenska Serien for the 1924–25 season.

Players

Squad stats

|}

Club

Other information

References
 

1924-25
Association football clubs 1924–25 season
Swedish football clubs 1924–25 season